Steven Downes (born June 28, 1950) is an American DJ and voice actor. He is best known for his work as the voice of the Master Chief in the Halo video game series. He worked as a disc jockey at Los Angeles, California Album-oriented Rock radio stations KWST (1978-1981), KEZY-AM (1981-1982) and KLSX (1994), but is best remembered working evening drive at KLOS from 1982 to 1991. He frequently hosted the live call-in talk show, Rockline in the early 1990s. Most recently, he worked as the morning show host for 97.1 WDRV "The Drive" in Chicago, Illinois. Downes also hosts the nationally syndicated radio show "The Classics". He is married to fellow voice actress Liz Zweifler.

On February 6, 2015, Downes announced that after 44 years in radio he would retire to spend more time with his family; his final show on WDRV was March 9, 2015. He was succeeded by veteran sports/talk radio hosts Dan McNeil and Pete McMurray.

Voice acting
Downes started in commercial voice since 1990. He has provided voices for several video games. His first experience in voice acting for video games came in 1999 when he played the role of Gunnar in the video game Septerra Core: Legacy of the Creator by Valkyrie Studios. Despite the relatively minor role, his performance caught the attention of the voice acting director and music composer of the game, Martin O'Donnell. When O'Donnell began working on the video game Halo: Combat Evolved at Bungie, he invited Downes to voice the game's main protagonist, Master Chief, a role he has voiced ever since.

Filmography

Television

Video games

References

External links
 
 https://m.imdb.com/name/nm1091994
Interview with Steve Downes by 4 Guys with Quarters
Interview with Steve Downes on the Mentally Obsessed Podcast

Living people
People from Columbus, Ohio
American male video game actors
American male voice actors
American radio DJs
Male actors from Los Angeles
20th-century American male actors
21st-century American male actors
1950 births
Halo (franchise)